A wagonette (little wagon) is a small horse-drawn vehicle with springs, which has two benches along the right and left side of the platform, people facing each other. The driver sits on a separate, front-facing bench. A wagonette may be open or have a tilt. A large horse-drawn enclosed vehicle with spring-suspension, a similar arrangement of the seats and obligatory roof is called a horsebus.

The 1914 book Motor Body-building in All Its Branches by Christopher William Terry, defined a shooting-brake as a wagonette provided with game and gun racks and accommodation for ammunition.

See also 
 Carriage
 Horsebus

References

Animal-powered vehicles
Horse transportation